Jeffrey Adam Lazaro (born March 21, 1968) is an American former professional ice hockey player.

Biography
As a youth, Lazaro played in the 1981 Quebec International Pee-Wee Hockey Tournament with the Boston Braves minor ice hockey team.

Lazaro played 102 games in the National Hockey League for the Boston Bruins and the Ottawa Senators, with 14 goals, 23 assists and 114 penalty minutes. He also played in the Austrian Hockey League with Graz 99ers and the Deutsche Eishockey Liga with the Ratingen Lions.

Lazaro was named to the 1997-98 ECHL All-Star Team.

Career statistics

Regular season and playoffs

International

References

External links

1968 births
Living people
American men's ice hockey right wingers
Adirondack Red Wings players
Boston Bruins players
EC Ratinger Löwen players
Graz 99ers players
Hamilton Bulldogs (AHL) players
Ice hockey players at the 1994 Winter Olympics
Maine Mariners players
New Hampshire Wildcats men's ice hockey players
New Haven Senators players
New Orleans Brass players
Olympic ice hockey players of the United States
Ottawa Senators players
Sportspeople from Waltham, Massachusetts
Providence Bruins players
Ice hockey players from Massachusetts
Undrafted National Hockey League players
Waltham High School alumni